Samantha is an unincorporated community in Tuscaloosa County, Alabama, United States. Samantha has a post office with ZIP code 35482. Samantha was named in honor of the wife of the first postmaster, Sylvester Monroe Cowden.

Notable people
 Dan Boone, Major League Baseball pitcher
 Ike Boone, Major League Baseball player

References

Unincorporated communities in Tuscaloosa County, Alabama
Unincorporated communities in Alabama